St James School is a mixed secondary school located in Exeter in the English county of Devon.

Previously a foundation school administered by Devon County Council, in May 2016 St James School was converted to academy status. The school is now part of the Ted Wragg Trust, but continues to coordinate with Devon County Council for admissions. The school moved into new buildings in February 2006.

St James School offers GCSEs and OCR Nationals as programmes of study for pupils. The school also has specialisms in mathematics and computing.

References

External links
St James School official website

Secondary schools in Devon
Schools in Exeter
Academies in Devon

Specialist maths and computing colleges in England